Araeomorpha limnophila is a moth in the family Crambidae. It is found in Australia, where it has been recorded from Queensland.

The wings are brown. There are two to three dark spots on the forewings.

References

Acentropinae
Moths of Australia
Moths described in 1937